Republic Island is a privately owned island on the Michigamme River in the U.S. state of Michigan. It is two acre-wide. As of 2012, it was listed as one of the world's most expensive private islands available to rent.

References

River islands of Michigan
Private islands of Michigan